Afraflacilla grayorum, the stridulating jumping spider is a species of spider in the family Salticidae. It is found in outback regions of Australia. Named in honour of Michael and Greta Gray.

References 

Salticidae
Spiders of Australia
Spiders described in 1993